Ellis Hue Hobbs III (born May 16, 1983) is an American former professional football player who was a cornerback for six seasons in the National Football League (NFL). He played college football for Iowa State Cyclones. He was drafted by the New England Patriots in the third round of the 2005 NFL Draft and played for them from 2005–2008. He was traded to the Philadelphia Eagles in April 2009 and played for them from 2009–2010 before a neck injury ended his career. Hobbs previously shared the NFL record for the longest kickoff return (108 yards) with Randall Cobb and Jacoby Jones, a feat he accomplished on September 9, 2007 in a game against the New York Jets. This record was eclipsed by a 109-yard kickoff return touchdown by Cordarrelle Patterson of the Minnesota Vikings against Green Bay on October 27, 2013.

Early years
Hobbs attended DeSoto High School in DeSoto, Texas, where he was a standout in football and track. In track, he participated on the 4x100 and 4x400 relay teams and the long jump. In football, he starred at cornerback as well as running back; he ran for 1,701 yards on 233 carries with 29 touchdowns and caught 18 passes for 265 yards and three touchdowns.

College career
Hobbs was just seven credits short of graduating when he entered the NFL, and in 2009 (four years after leaving college) he completed his degree and graduated from Iowa State University with a bachelor's degree in art and design. A three-year starter at right cornerback, he compiled 209 tackles, two sacks, three fumble recoveries, two forced fumbles, and 29 pass deflections during his tenure. He also found success as a kick returner, gaining 490 yards on 24 career kick returns. He earned All-Big 12 Conference first-team honors as a senior. Hobbs also received the Academic Athlete of the Year Award and was a finalist for Christian Athlete of the Year at Iowa State.

Professional career

New England Patriots

2005–06 seasons
Despite limited playing time early in the season, Hobbs made a number of contributions to the Patriots in his rookie season. A string of injuries in the Patriots secondary resulted in Hobbs starting at cornerback the final eight games of the season. Hobbs caught three interceptions and earned 371 yards on 15 kickoff returns (including a crucial 35-yard return in the Patriots' game-winning drive against the Pittsburgh Steelers).

Although Hobbs initially won the starting cornerback job in 2006 opposite Asante Samuel, Hobbs struggled somewhat during his second year in the NFL, in part because of a broken wrist suffered early in the season. Hobbs, who wore a black cast for much of the season, missed a couple of games and lost his job as starter during the second half of the season. Nevertheless, he had two interceptions for the season (one in garbage time against the Vikings, which he returned 70 yards). In addition, filling in for an injured Laurence Maroney at kick returner, he returned a kick against the Miami Dolphins for 51 yards, and returned a kick against the Houston Texans for 93 yards and a touchdown, the first of his career, and the first kickoff return for a touchdown by a Patriot since Bethel Johnson in 2004. For the season, he recorded 47 total tackles, 2 interceptions, and 4 passes defensed. He also recorded 14 total tackles in the Patriots' three playoff games.

Hobbs performed well in the 2006 playoffs, breaking up several potential touchdown passes, including two in the Divisional round against the San Diego Chargers, and one in the AFC Championship Game against the Indianapolis Colts. That play against the Colts was flagged as pass interference, a call that proved controversial.  Greg Aiello, NFL vice president of communications, stated it was correctly flagged as pass interference. However, there were also reports that the NFL admitted the call was incorrect, and apologized to Hobbs.  Hobbs also returned a kickoff 80 yards in the AFC Championship Game.

2007–08 seasons
On September 9, 2007, Hobbs broke the record for the longest kickoff return in NFL history when he ran a Mike Nugent kickoff back 108 yards for a touchdown against the New York Jets at Giants Stadium. At the time, it also tied the record for the longest play in NFL history.

In Week 3, against the Bills, Hobbs recorded his first NFL sack when he brought down J. P. Losman on a blitz; he also forced a fumble, which was recovered by Patriots defensive end Jarvis Green. In Week 10, in the rematch at Buffalo, Hobbs recovered a fumble by Bills running back Dwayne Wright (forced by Patriots safety James Sanders), and returned it for his second return touchdown of the season.

In Week 17 against the New York Giants, Hobbs intercepted a pass by Giants quarterback Eli Manning in the fourth quarter, which ultimately led to the Patriots' go-ahead touchdown in the game that completed New England's perfect 16-0 season. He also intercepted a pass by Chargers quarterback Philip Rivers in the AFC Championship Game.

In Super Bowl XLII, Hobbs intercepted Manning again.  This time on a pass that deflected off the hands of New York Giants rookie wide receiver, Steve Smith. However, later in the game, with only 35 seconds left, wide receiver Plaxico Burress beat Hobbs to the left corner of the end zone for what ended up being a game-winning 13-yard touchdown pass.

Hobbs played in the Super Bowl with a torn labrum in his shoulder in addition to the chronic groin pain previously reported. Hobbs had Dr. James Andrews repair the shoulder, which was originally injured in Week 9, on February 12.

In 2008, Hobbs intercepted three passes and set the Patriots single game record for yards on kick returns, with 237 yards in a loss to Miami in Week 3. He also returned his third career touchdown against the Oakland Raiders in Week 15 which once again earned him Special Teams Player of the Week honors. He ended the season leading the AFC, and second in the NFL, in kick return average.

Philadelphia Eagles
On the second day of the 2009 NFL Draft, the Patriots traded Hobbs to the Philadelphia Eagles for two fifth-round selections, which the Patriots traded for fourth- and sixth-round selections; the Patriots ultimately drafted guard Rich Ohrnberger and long snapper Jake Ingram with the picks they received for Hobbs. Hobbs won the starting kick returner job over rookie wide receiver Jeremy Maclin for the 2009 season. On November 11, Hobbs was placed on injured reserve with a neck injury.

Hobbs was re-signed to a one-year contract on March 30, 2010. On April 2, the Eagles traded starting cornerback Sheldon Brown to the Cleveland Browns, with Hobbs now favored to start alongside former Patriots teammate Asante Samuel.

In the early third quarter of the Eagles' November 21, 2010 game against the Giants, Hobbs took a blow to the head from the Giants' Dave Tollefson while returning a kick, and had to be carted off the field. He suffered a disc injury and was placed on injured reserve. He announced his retirement on July 28, 2011.

Statistics

Regular season

Playoffs

Regular season

Playoffs

Source: NFL.com

References

External links

Philadelphia Eagles bio
New England Patriots bio

1983 births
Living people
Sportspeople from Niagara Falls, New York
American football cornerbacks
American football return specialists
African-American players of American football
Iowa State Cyclones football players
New England Patriots players
Philadelphia Eagles players
People from DeSoto, Texas
Players of American football from New York (state)
Players of American football from Texas
Sportspeople from the Dallas–Fort Worth metroplex
21st-century African-American sportspeople
20th-century African-American people